The 2011–12 season was Aberdeen's 99th season in the top flight of Scottish football and their 100th season overall. Aberdeen will compete in the Scottish Premier League, Scottish Cup and Scottish League Cup. Aberdeen were knocked out of the Scottish League Cup at the third round stage, losing on penalties to East Fife after a 3–3 draw. In the Scottish Cup, Aberdeen lost 1–2 to Hibernian in the semi final. Aberdeen finished in 9th place in the Scottish Premier League.

Results and fixtures

Pre-season

Scottish Premier League

Scottish League Cup

Aberdeen entered the Scottish League Cup in the second round stage, having not qualified for Europe in 2010–11. Darren Mackie scored the only goal of the game, as Aberdeen defeated First Division opponents Dundee.  Aberdeen were knocked out in the third round by Second Division club East Fife.

Scottish Cup

Aberdeen entered the Scottish Cup in the fourth round stage.

Statistics

Appearances and Goals

|}

As of 12 May 2012

Disciplinary record

As of 12 May 2012

Goal scorers

As of 12 May 2012

Competitions

Overall

Scottish Premier League

League table

Results summary

Results by round

Results by opponent

Source: 2011–12 Scottish Premier League article

Transfers

Players In

Players Out

See also
 List of Aberdeen F.C. seasons

References

Aberdeen F.C. seasons
Aberdeen